Jonathan Luke Clare (born 14 June 1986) is an English cricketer who formerly played for Derbyshire. An all-rounder, he is a right-handed batsman and a right-arm medium-pace bowler.

Early life
Clare was born in Burnley, Lancashire. He attended St Theodore's RC High School in the town. From a young age he played for Burnley Cricket Club, following in the footsteps of fellow cricketer James Anderson.

Career
Clare's Second XI Championship debut came as a sixteen-year-old in the 2003 competition, in which he played two games for his home county, Lancashire's second XI team. Clare has been regularly appearing for Derbyshire's Second XI since 2005, making his debut in the competition with a half-century against Nottinghamshire's Second XI. Clare made his List A debut for Derbyshire in the 2007 Pro40 League competition, playing against Durham. Batting from the lower-middle order, he was bowled out for 12 runs in his first innings by Liam Plunkett, before bowling two expensive overs in the Durham innings. Jonathan Clare's grandfather, John Clare, played Lancashire League cricket for Burnley for seven years, grandson having played sporadically in the competition since the age of fourteen, having made his debut in the competition as an opener in 2001, alongside professional representative, Dale Benkenstein. Clare's appearance in the County Championship made him Derbyshire's thirteenth debutant of the season, a record exceeded, save for the county's debut season, merely twice since their foundation. Clare made his first-class debut on 6 September 2007, against Notts. He gained the distinction of taking five wickets on debut, when he took 5–90 in Notts' only innings. On 10 September 2007, it was confirmed Clare would be awarded a county contract for the 2008 season, and on 13 May 2008, Clare signed a contract to last until the end of 2009. After missing most of the last two seasons due to injury, it was announced in September 2015 that Clare had been released by Derbyshire, having played in a total of 136 games for the club, 57 of them at first-class levels.

References

External links

1986 births
Living people
Cricketers from Burnley
English cricketers
Derbyshire cricketers